Nelson Alberto Barahona Collins (born 22 November 1987 in Colón) is a Panamanian football attacking midfielder. He currently plays for the Categoría Primera B side Real Cartagena in Colombia.

Club career
Nicknamed el Russo, Barahona played numerous of years in Árabe Unido's youth team before in 2007 making his debut with the senior team. After having several good appearances with the club and the Panama youth team he moved to Uruguayan side Fénix. Russo made his league debut with Fénix as a second-half substitute on 27 February 2008 against Nacional. Unfortunately, Fénix were relegated and Barahona returned to ANAPROF side Árabe Unido where he was crowned champion of the ANAPROF Clausura 2008.

On 28 February 2009 Barahona signed a 1-year loan contract with Colombian side Atlético Huila making him the second Panamanian in team after Amilcar Henriquez was signed in December 2008. He played his last game for Árabe Unido on 27 February 2009.

By 2010 he was transferred to Independiente Medellín, a club with which he had the chance to play the 2010 Copa Libertadores. At the end of the year, he was loaned to Venezuelan side Caracas FC.

In mid-2011 he returned to Independiente Medellín, club owner of his sports rights, but on 2 September 2011 he was hired by Deportivo Táchira of Venezuela whom he subsequently left in December 2011.

On 17 January 2012 Atlético Huila confirmed him as the new reinforcement for the 2012 season, Barahona joining compatriots Amílcar Henríquez and Alejandro Vélez at the club. This is his second stay in the club. In February 2013, he signed with Itagüí and he moved to Alianza Petrolera in December 2013.

In 2015, Barahona returned to Panama after seven years abroad to play for San Francisco.

International career
Barahona was part of the Panama U-20 squad that participated in the 2007 FIFA U-20 World Cup in Canada. He scored Panama's only goal of the tournament against Czech Republic.

He made his senior debut for Panama on 22 August 2007 against Guatemala and has, as of 1 May 2015, earned a total of 45 caps, scoring 4 goals. He represented his country in 13 FIFA World Cup qualification matches and was part of the national team that won the 2009 UNCAF Nations Cup in Honduras. In 2011, he was called up by Julio Dely Valdés to play at the 2011 CONCACAF Gold Cup.

International goals
Scores and results list Panama's goal tally first.

Honours

Club
Árabe Unido
 ANAPROF Clausura 2008
Atlético Huila
 Torneo Finalización 2009 (Runner-up)
Mejor jugador de fútbol profesional local
COSAWARDS 2017

National
 2009 UNCAF Nations Cup

References

External links
 
 

1987 births
Living people
Sportspeople from Colón, Panama
Association football midfielders
Panamanian footballers
Panama international footballers
2009 UNCAF Nations Cup players
2009 CONCACAF Gold Cup players
2011 CONCACAF Gold Cup players
Copa Centroamericana-winning players
C.D. Árabe Unido players
Centro Atlético Fénix players
Atlético Huila footballers
Independiente Medellín footballers
Caracas FC players
Deportivo Táchira F.C. players
Alianza Petrolera players
San Francisco F.C. players
Categoría Primera A players
Panamanian expatriate footballers
Expatriate footballers in Colombia
Expatriate footballers in Uruguay
Expatriate footballers in Venezuela